Turkish Airlines Flight 452 was a scheduled domestic passenger flight operated by a Boeing 727-2F2 of Turkish Airlines that crashed near Isparta on 19 September 1976 while en route from Istanbul Atatürk Airport (IST/LTBA) to Antalya Airport (AYT/LTAI), killing all 144 passengers and 11 crew members on board. The crash is Turkey's deadliest aviation accident.

The aircraft arrived from Italy at Istanbul and took off again at 22:45 local time. The pilots started to descend into Antalya at 23:11 with the captain in the passenger cabin.

Most passengers were heading to Antalya for vacation and were not Turkish. The bodies of 18 Italian victims were buried at a cemetery near Isparta instead of being sent to Italy. A member of the Grand National Assembly of Turkey also died in the crash.

Aircraft and crew 
The aircraft involved in the accident was a Boeing 727-2F2 registered as TC-JBH with serial number 20982/1087. The aircraft made its first flight on 11 November 1974. The plane was delivered to the airline on 1 December. TC-JBH was named Antalya, the destination of the flight.

The captain was Celâl Topçuoğlu and the first officer was Sacit Soğangöz. Also on board were flight engineer Ahmet Bursalı and technician Muhittin Güçlü. The four cabin crew members were Feyzan Güngör, Neriman Düzelli, Kâmuran Küçükkoşum and Canan Dinç. Three Turkish Airlines employees, due to fly a McDonnell Douglas DC-9 from Antalya to Istanbul the next morning, were also deadheading on the flight.

Accident 

The plane arrived at Istanbul Atatürk Airport (IST/LTBA) from Italy at 21:30 local time with 68 passengers. 78 more passengers boarded at Istanbul and the plane took off at 22:45 with a delay of 35 minutes.

After being told by the pilots that they had the runway in sight, the controller at Antalya notified them that he couldn't see them. First officer Soğangöz responded: "should I believe you, or my eyes?" Captain Topçuoğlu, who was in the passenger cabin, came back to the cockpit after realizing that something was wrong and gave full throttle.

Eyewitnesses reported that the plane flew very close to the city and that they could "almost see the passengers". The aircraft passed the Sidre Tepe Hill near Isparta, after which it started to climb. At 23:20, a loud explosion was heard from the Karatepe Hill, the hill after Sidre Tepe. At the time of the accident, a horror film was being aired on television, causing some to leave their homes after the explosion.

Wreckage and recovery 

After hearing the explosion, nearby residents climbed for two hours to the top of the hill. Military personnel were dispatched to the area and were already on the scene. They found pieces of the aircraft on fire and extinguished them by throwing sand on top. One of the wings was found on top of the hill, while the engines were located at the bottom. A generator was used to light up the site during the nights. To prevent looting of items, officials closed the area to civilians, but thousands of people went up the hill and were able to see the airplane parts and bodies after midnight. The first flight recorder was found the day after the accident. The flight data recorder was found on 22 September. In 2009, parts of the plane could still be found at the crash site.

Victims 
A total of 155 people, 144 passengers and 11 Turkish Airlines employees, were killed in the accident, with 125 of those passengers being of non-Turkish descent. Most passengers on the flight were Italian travelers traveling to Antalya for tourism purposes. A former Italian soldier and recipient of the Gold Medal of Military Valour, Enrico Martini, was also killed. İlhan Cavcav was on board the aircraft on the first leg and was also due to continue with the flight to Antalya, but changed his mind and flew to Ankara instead.

According to eyewitnesses, the bodies of victims were badly burned, making identification impossible. While most bodies of Italian victims were sent to Italy, 18 of the Italian passengers were buried at a local cemetery. , the crash is the deadliest aviation accident to occur in Turkey.

Investigation 
The possibility of the plane crashing due to a lightning strike was eliminated the next day after looking at the weather report. Investigators listened to the cockpit voice recorder on 22 September. The transcript of this was kept secret as it could determine the cause. The experts who listened to the recordings announced that the pilots were trying to fly visually, instead of using instrumental flight as it was required at night and that they mistakenly thought that the dark area ahead of them was the Mediterranean Sea, while it actually was the Western Taurus Mountains. This led them to believe that the city lights of Isparta were from Antalya. It was further found that the system of Antalya Airport informing the pilots of their distance to the airport broke three days before the crash.

Notes

References

Citations

Bibliography

External links 
 

Turkish Airlines Flight 452
Aviation accidents and incidents in Turkey
Turkish Airlines Flight 452
452
Airliner accidents and incidents involving controlled flight into terrain
Turkish Airlines Flight 452
Turkish Airlines Flight 452
History of Isparta
September 1976 events in Europe